Mark Mangerson (born December 26, 1948) was an American jurist.

Born in Rhinelander, Wisconsin, Mangerson received in bachelors and law degrees from Valparaiso University. He was district attorney for Oneida and Vilas Counties, Wisconsin. Mangerson served as a Wisconsin Circuit Court judge for Oneida County. In 2011, Mangerson was appointed judge of the Wisconsin Court of Appeals. In 2014, Mangerson retired.

Notes

1948 births
Living people
People from Rhinelander, Wisconsin
Valparaiso University alumni
Wisconsin state court judges
Wisconsin Court of Appeals judges
District attorneys in Wisconsin